Guangdong International Circuit is a motor sport facility located at Da Wang, Sihui, in Zhaoqing city in China, approx 45 mins by car from Guangzhou. Designed by a female Chinese designer Qiming Yao, it is the second permanent motor sport facility in Guangdong, China, after Zhuhai International Circuit. The Guangdong International Circuit completed in 2009.

Grading
The circuit holds an International FIA Grade "III" license and can hold F3, A1GP and WTCC races.

Layout

Events
The circuit hosted the China Touring Car Championship in December 2009 as its opening event.

The circuit hosts the China Touring Car Championship, Hong Kong Touring Car Championship and the China Superbike Championship in 2010. It was announced on December 12, 2010 that the circuit also to host the China round of the 2011 WTCC season. However, on September 30, 2011 was announced that the race would be hosted by the Shanghai Tianma Circuit.

Notes

References

External links

Official website (Chinese only)
Detailed Track Maps

Buildings and structures in Zhaoqing
Sports venues in Guangdong
Motorsport venues in Guangdong